Dunnstable Township is a township in Clinton County, Pennsylvania, United States. The population was 1,002 at the 2020 census.

History
The Rich-McCormick Woolen Factory was listed on the National Register of Historic Places in 1985.

Geography

Demographics

As of the census of 2000, there were 945 people, 366 households, and 285 families residing in the township. The population density was 101.3 people per square mile (39.1/km2). There were 381 housing units at an average density of 40.8/sq mi (15.8/km2). The racial makeup of the township was 98.5% White, 0.3% African American, 0.6% Asian, 0.1% from other races, and 0.4% from two or more races. Hispanic or Latino of any race were 0.4% of the population.

There were 366 households, out of which 27.3% had children under the age of 18 living with them, 68.6% were married couples living together, 6.0% had a female householder with no husband present, and 21.9% were non-families. 17.8% of all households were made up of individuals, and 9.3% had someone living alone who was 65 years of age or older. The average household size was 2.57 and the average family size was 2.88.

In the township the population was spread out, with 21.7% under the age of 18, 5.3% from 18 to 24, 27.4% from 25 to 44, 28.8% from 45 to 64, and 16.8% who were 65 years of age or older. The median age was 43 years. For every 100 females there were 99.4 males. For every 100 females age 18 and over, there were 98.9 males.

The median income for a household in the township was $47,981, and the median income for a family was $51,250. Males had a median income of $32,333 versus $20,469 for females. The per capita income for the township was $19,382. About 4.1% of families and 5.4% of the population were below the poverty line, including 4.5% of those under age 18 and 9.7% of those age 65 or over.

References

Populated places established in 1785
Townships in Clinton County, Pennsylvania